2012 LATAM Challenge Series season is the fifth season of LATAM Challenge Series. The season started on April 22 in Guadalajara, and will finish on November 25 in Puebla. There will be nine double events, seven in Mexico and two in United States (both in Texas). The defending champion Giancarlo Serenelli migrated to Auto GP and GP2.

Drivers 

The car will not have changes in this season. The cars were powered by 2019 cm3 L4 Volkswagen FSI Motors. Tatuus chassis are used. Kumho Tires supplies the tires Kumho Ecsta.

Team changes 

 A3 Energy Drink entered to series with two Costa Rican drivers, the 2009 champion André Solano and James Adams.

Driver changes 

 Leaving LATAM

 The three times champion, Giancarlo Serenelli, left the series to run in Auto GP World Series and GP2 Series.
 Alex Popow left the series to run in Rolex Sports Car Series.
 Diego Ferreira moved to Star Mazda Championship.
 Diego Menchaca left the series to run in Formula Renault BARC with Fortec Motorsport.

 Mid-season changes
 Charlie Guerrero, son of the international driver Carlos Guerrero, debuted with RE Racing in the Round 2.

Schedule 

The 2012 schedule has two main changes; the Guadalajara and Aguascalientes races will be run, while Monterrey was dropped from the calendar.

Race results

Race summaries

Round 1: Guadalajara Grand Challenge 

The season started in Guadalajara. Rudy Camarillo won the first event (37:05.531, 121.05 km/h). In the second lap, Gabriel Iemma and Sebastián Arriola have a crash, both failed to continue the race. Francisco Cerullo finished in second place 2.964 seconds behind. Martín Fuentes in third place, 8.230 seconds behind Camarillo. The second race, the Venezuelan driver Francisco Cerullo took his maiden victory in the series (37:01.820, 121.25 km/h). Cerullo suffered a puncture in the last lap, but he drove to finished ahead by 5 seconds. The podium again was conformed by Camarillo and Fuentes. Camarillo and Cerullo shared the lead of the championship with 52 points.

Round 2: San Luis Potosí Grand Challenge 

The second race took place in the Autódromo San Luis 400 in Tangamanga Park. Rudy Camarillo started in pole position. He took the lead for more than half of the race, but in the final laps was reversed by André Solano (38:39.519, 117.02 km/h), who finished in first place. Martín Fuentes came in third place, for third time in a row. James Adams had a crash with Francisco Cerullo leaving the Adams' car rear suspension broken. Camarillo accumulated 78 points, 8 ahead of Francisco Cerullo, who set the fastest lap. The second race Martín Fuentes took the lead after yellow flag (39:49.352, 109.68 km/h). Camarillo saw reduced his advantage over Cerullo to only 2 points.

Round 3: Toluca Grand Challenge 

The third round will be raced in the Centro Dinámico Pegaso, in Toluca. The Team CSM's driver Rudy Camarillo took the pole with lap record (0:58.965 119.05 km/h). José Carlos Sandoval will start in the front row. Rudy Camarillo won the first race leading all of the race. Juan Carlos Sandoval finished in second place followed by André Solano. Cerullo, the second in the championship, had an accident and lost positions finished in tenth place. In the race two, Martín Fuentes get the reversed pole, led the race until the lap 13. When Fuentes made a mistake, and fell to 7th place. Juan Carlos Sandoval reached the first place and won his first race in the season. Francisco Cerullo finished in second place and André Solano in third. After the third weekend, Rudy Camarillo stays in the top 22 points ahead of Francisco Cerullo.

Round 4: Zacatecas Grand Challenge 

The fourth round of the season will be in Zacatecas. The 2.04 km of length will be used.

Championship standings 

Points are awarded to drivers on the following basis (regardless of whether the car is running at the end of the race):

Bonus points:
 2 for Fastest Lap
 2 for Pole Position

References 

2012 in motorsport
Lata
2012
2012 in North American sport
2012 in American motorsport